Staroseltsevo is a rural locality (a selo) in Volokonovsky District, Belgorod Oblast, Russia. The population was 190 as of 2010. There are 2 streets.

Geography 
Staroseltsevo is located 13 km south of Volokonovka (the district's administrative centre) by road. Pyatnitskoye is the nearest rural locality.

References 

Rural localities in Volokonovsky District